Pa Alam (Persian: پاعلم Pā ‘Alam; also known as Pā ‘Alam-e Shāh Aḩmad, Pol-e-Zāl, Pol Tang, Pul-ī-Tang, and Pol-e Tang)  Pa Alam Rural District, in the Central District of Pol-e Dokhtar County, Lorestan Province, Iran. At the 2006 census, its population was 1,487, in 301 families.

References 

paalam.ir

Towns and villages in Pol-e Dokhtar County